Broomfield  is a village in the Maidstone District of Kent, England, and forms part of the civil parish of Broomfield and Kingswood. The village is located just upstream of Leeds Castle on the River Len, one of the tributaries of the River Medway.

The parish church is dedicated to Saint Margaret. In the 16th and 17th centuries Broomfield was home to the first two generations of the Hatch family of bellfounders, who lived in the farmhouse at Roses Farm. Their output included the bell known as "Bell Harry", after which the central tower of Canterbury Cathedral is known.

There is also a Broomfield, in East Kent, in the parish of Herne and Broomfield, on the outskirts of Herne Bay.

References

Bibliography

Villages in Kent